Japanese football in 1957.

Emperor's Cup

Births
February 9 - Ruy Ramos
April 14 - Haruhisa Hasegawa
April 14 - Masaru Uchiyama
August 1 - Yoshio Kato
October 14 - Ikuo Takahara
November 4 - Yoshinori Ishigami
November 21 - Kozo Tashima
November 28 - Yasutaro Matsuki
November 29 - Tetsuo Sugamata

External links

 
Seasons in Japanese football